Gerald Patterson defeated Algernon Kingscote 6–2, 6–1, 6–3 in the All Comers' Final, and then defeated the reigning champion Norman Brookes 6–3, 7–5, 6–2 in the challenge round to win the gentlemen's singles tennis title at the 1919 Wimbledon Championships.

Draw

Challenge round

All-Comers' Finals

Top half

Section 1

Section 2

Section 3

Section 4

Bottom half

Section 5

Section 6

Section 7

Section 8

References

External links

Men's Singles
Wimbledon Championship by year – Men's singles